Hajji Mamdan (also Romanized as Ḩājjī Mamdān; also known as Haji Mamadan, Hāji Māmdān, Ḩājī Mamedān, Ḩajī Moḩammad Dān, Ḩājjī Moḩammadān, and Ḩājj Mamz̄ān) is a village in Chehel Cheshmeh-ye Gharbi Rural District, Sarshiv District, Saqqez County, Kurdistan Province, Iran. At the 2006 census, its population was 341, in 59 families. The village is populated by Kurds.

References 

Towns and villages in Saqqez County
Kurdish settlements in Kurdistan Province